Ivo of Chartres (also Ives, Yves, or Yvo; ;  1040 – 23 December 1115), also known as Saint Ivo in the Roman Catholic Church, was the Bishop of Chartres, France from 1090 until his death, and an important canonist during the Investiture Crisis.

Three extensive canonical works, namely Tripartita, Decretum, and Panormia, are attributed to him. He corresponded extensively. His liturgical feast is observed on 23 May.

Life
Ivo of Chartres was born in or near Chartres circa 1040 to a family of relatively low social status. He is claimed to have studied first in Paris, then in Abbey of Bec in Normandy where, according to Robert of Torigni, he studied under Lanfranc along with Anselm of Canterbury.

Not much is known of him until some time after he was admitted to the Roman Catholic clergy. His first benefice was at Nesle in Picardy. In 1067 Bishop Gui asked him to become the abbot of the new Augustinian house of St. Quentin at Beauvais. Ivo was skeptical of religious excess and always stressed moderation in practice. He remained at St. Quentin for twenty years and established himself as one of the best teachers in France. St. Quentin came to be known as a great school of theology.

His knowledge of canon law, both as a lawyer and cleric, most probably earned him in 1090 the office of Bishop of Chartres. His predecessor, Geoffrey, had been removed from office by Pope Urban II. Geoffrey's relatives and supporters initially opposed Ivo's appointment, but with the backing of Pope Urban II, King Philip, and the influential Countess Adela of Blois, Ivo was eventually grudgingly accepted. In light of the events preceding his appointment to the office, his strong opposition to the practice of simony may have been the impetus to his episcopal elevation.

During his twenty-five year episcopacy at Chartres, Ivo was involved in conflicts with many magnates including King Philip I of France, Archbishop Richer of Sens, the papal legate Hugh of Die, and several local nobles. The most famous case concerned the marriage of King Philip, who in the early 1090s tried to repudiate his wife Bertha of Holland in order to marry Bertrade of Anjou. Local baron Hugh Le Puiset took advantage of the situation to seize episcopal lands and imprison the bishop for a short time.

Ivo was an acquaintance of Countess Adele of Blois, who helped him reform the Abbey of St. Jean-en-Vallée. In addition, on several occasions he defended her decisions, most notably during the events regarding Rotrou III of Perche, when he refused to assert ecclesiastical sanctions against him.

Around 1114, Ivo granted to Bernard of Abbeville land in Thiron-Gardais, where Bernard established the monastery that would become the Abbey of the Holy Trinity of Tiron. 

During his episcopacy he wrote the majority of his extant works, for which he later became famous and considered among the greatest scholars of the mediaeval era.

Works

Ivo was a prolific writer but is most known for his canonical works: the Decretum of seventeen books; the Tripartita, of very substantial material, divided in three parts, and attributed to him; and the Panormia of eight books attributed to him. All three are primarily works of canon law. The Prologue to the Decretum deals with the interpretation of canon law, and specifically argues that caritas was the solution for sin, and not harsh punishment without contrition. "He was called to teach. His lesson was love. It was all that mattered.".

Ivo is also famous for his 288 letters of correspondence. These letters often dealt with liturgical, canonical, and dogmatic questions and, much like his major works, are from the perspective of caritas. Several of his extant sermons, totaling 25, treat of the same topics as his other writings and letters.

It has also been suggested that his doctrines influenced the final agreement of the Concordat of Worms in 1122.

Subsequent influence and veneration

Ivo's writings had considerable influence in the twelfth century and beyond. Many of his letters and sermons circulated already in his lifetime, and were copied widely especially in the mid-twelfth century. The same is true for the canonical collections attributed to him; they were copied frequently and used in the making of other collections. For example, Gratian’s Concordia Discordantium Canonum (commonly denominated Decretum Gratiani) draws on both the Tripartita and the Panormia. Alger of Liège was strongly influenced by Ivo's Prologus and quoted from his Decretum. Peter Abelard in his Sic et Non used the Prologue, too, and apparently quoted both from Ivo's Decretum and from the Panormia.

Although it is not known when he was canonized, 23 May is his present liturgical memorial. Before 1570 it was observed on 20 May.

References

Sources

 On-going critical edition of his works (and the collections attributed to him): 

 Edition of the Prologue: 
 English translation of the Prologue: 

 French translation of his letters: 
  Women's Biography: Adela, countess of Blois, Chartres, and Meaux. Contains several of his letters to Adela of Normandy.
  Latin text and French translation of his letters: http://telma-chartes.irht.cnrs.fr/yves-de-chartres

Literature
Barker, Lynn K. "MS Bodl. Canon. Pat. Lat. 131 and a Lost Lactantius of John of Salisbury: Evidence in Search of a French Critic of Thomas Becket." Albion: A Quarterly Journal Concerned with British Studies, Vol. 22, No. 1 (Spring, 1990), pp. 26

Izbicki, Thomas M. "Review of Prefaces to Canon Law Books in Latin Christianity: Selected Translations, 500–1247. by Robert Somerville ; Bruce Brasington." The Sixteenth Century Journal, Vol. 30, No. 1 (Spring, 1999), pp. 314.
Livingstone, Amy. "Kith and Kin: Kinship and Family Structure of the Nobility of Eleventh- and Twelfth Century Blois-Chartres." French Historical Studies, Vol. 20, No. 3 (Summer, 1997), pp. 435, 452.
.
Rolker, Christof. "The earliest work of Ivo of Chartres: The case of Ivo's Eucharist florilegium and the canon law collections attributed to him." Zeitschrift der Savigny-Stiftung für Rechtsgeschichte, kanonistische Abteilung 124 (2007), pp. 109–127.

 
 
Wormald, Patrick. The Making of the English Law: King Alfred to the Twelfth Century. [city unknown]: Blackwell Publishing, 1999. pp. 471.

1040s births
1115 deaths
Canon law jurists
11th-century French Roman Catholic bishops
12th-century French Roman Catholic bishops
Bishops of Chartres
12th-century French writers
12th-century Latin writers
12th-century jurists